Adhyathmaramayanam Kilippattu is the most popular Malayalam version of the Sanskrit Hindu epic Ramayana. It is believed to have been written by Thunchaththu Ramanujan Ezhuthachan in the early 17th century, and is considered to be a classic of Malayalam literature and an important text in the history of Malayalam language. It is a retelling of the Sanskrit work Adhyatma Ramayana in kilippattu (bird song) format. Ezhuthachan used the Grantha-based Malayalam script to write his Ramayana, although the Vatteluttu writing system was the traditional writing system of Kerala then. Recitation of Adhyathmaramayanam Kilippattu is very important in Hindu families in Kerala. The month of Karkitakam in the Malayalam calendar is celebrated as the Ramayana recitation month and Ramayana is recited in Hindu houses and temples across Kerala.

Date and authorship

Tradition ascribes the authorship of the Sanskrit Adhyathma Ramayana to Ramananda since it is said to be an integral part of the Brahmanda Purana. However, some scholars attribute it to the period 14th - 15th century CE and the author as unknown. The Adhyathma Ramayana is the portrayal of a conversation between the god Shiva and his wife Parvati, as reported by the god Brahma to the sage Narada. It is this work that provided Tulasidas with the inspiration to compose his immortal work, the Ramacharitamanasa. This is the same work which was translated by Thunchathu Ezhuthachan into Malayalam in the form of kilippattu, a South Indian genre in which a parrot recites the text to the poet.

Deviation from Valmiki Ramayana

 In Adhyatma Ramayana everyone praises and chants the hymn on Rama starting from Vamadeva, Valmiki, Bharadwaja, Narada, Viradha, Sarabanga River, Sutikshna, Agasthya, Viswamitra, Vasishta, Jatayu, Kabhanda, Sabari, Swayamprabha, Parasurama, Vibhishana, and Hanuman. This is absent in Valmiki's.

References

External links 
 Audio of the Adhyathma Ramayanam - Rendering by Dr. A. P. Sukumar
 Adhyatma Ramayana in Devanagari, Malayalam and other Indian Scripts as webpages and PDF
 Adhyatma Raramayanam - Malayalam - Tunchathu Ezhuthachan

Malayalam language
Works based on the Ramayana